A Quiet Place: Day One is an upcoming American horror film, directed by Michael Sarnoski, from a screenplay he co-wrote with Jeff Nichols, based on an original story by John Krasinski. It is intended to be a spin-off prequel, and the third overall installment of the A Quiet Place film series. The film is scheduled to be released theatrically on March 8, 2024.

Cast 
 Lupita Nyong'o
 Joseph Quinn
 Alex Wolff
 Djimon Hounsou as the Man on the Island

Production

Development 
In November 2020, it was announced by Paramount Pictures that a spin-off film set within the same world as A Quiet Place, with Jeff Nichols set to serve as writer/director, based on an original story by John Krasinski. Krasinski will also serve as producer alongside Michael Bay, Andrew Form, and Brad Fuller.  The film is a co-production between Paramount Pictures, Sunday Night Productions, and Platinum Dunes. In May 2021, Krasinski announced that the script is complete and submitted to the studio. By October of the same year however, Nichols stepped down as director citing creative differences; while the studio was reported to be quickly looking for a replacement. In January 2022, Michael Sarnoski was announced as director, and will also complete a rewrite of the script. In April 2022 at CinemaCon, the film's title was officially announced as A Quiet Place: Day One.

Casting 
The casting of Lupita Nyong'o and Joseph Quinn were reported in November 2022. Alex Wolff was cast in January 2023. In March 2023, Djimon Hounsou was revealed to reprise his role from A Quiet Place Part II.

Filming 
Principal photography began on February 6, 2023 in London.

Release 
The film is set to release on March 8, 2024, having been delayed from a March 31, 2023 and a September 22, 2023 release.

References

External links 
 

2020s American films
2020s English-language films
2020s monster movies
2020s science fiction horror films
2024 horror films
2024 science fiction films
American monster movies
American science fiction horror films
American Sign Language films
Film spin-offs
Films about deaf people
Films produced by Andrew Form
Films produced by Bradley Fuller
Films produced by Michael Bay
Films shot in London
Paramount Pictures films
Platinum Dunes films
A Quiet Place (film series)
Upcoming English-language films